Dawa Life Sciences is a Kenyan life sciences company with core competencies in healthcare. It was founded by Dr. Raju Mohindra and Dr. Ajay Patel in 1994. Dawa Life Sciences provides better medication for humans and animals (Pharmaceuticals and Animal Health) and supports high-quality food and water supply (Chemicals). The company is based in Kenya and is structured to offer a wide range of products and support throughout the region and beyond.

Location
Dawa Life Sciences Pharmaceuticals: Dawa Limited, Baba Dogo Road, Ruaraka, P.O Box 16633-00620 - Nairobi, Kenya

Dawa Life Sciences Animal Health: Medisel Kenya Limited, General Kago Road, P.O Box 540-01000 - Thika, Kenya

Dawa Life Sciences Chemicals: Kel Chemicals Limited, Thika-Garissa Road, P.O Box 1444-01000 - Thika, Kenya

History 
1994 – Medisel Kenya Limited established in 1995 by Dr. Raju Mohindra and Dr Ajay Patel, focusing on distributing imported pharmaceuticals.

2004 – Acquisition of Dawa Pharmaceuticals Limited, adding pharmaceutical manufacturing capabilities

2013 – Construction of dedicated Beta Lactam manufacturing facility  

2016 – Acquisition of Kel Chemicals

2016 – Construction of Animal Health manufacturing facility

2020 – Dawa 2.0 Upgrade and expansion of existing general formulation block

2021 – Unification of identity to Dawa Life Sciences .

The pharmaceutical business division manufactures and distributes nearly 200 generic medicines in the region. The major dosage forms of products are tablets, capsules, syrups & suspensions.

Pharmaceuticals
Dawa Limited, established as Dawa Pharmaceuticals Ltd. in 1974, was at the forefront of pharmaceutical manufacturing in East and Central Africa and made products under contract for the UK’s Beecham Pharmaceuticals which is now known as GSK. It was bought by Medisel Kenya Limited in 2004 as a strategy to grow and enhance the pharmaceutical industry in Kenya and then renamed Dawa Limited.

It has since grown and acquired a significant presence across African continent with commercial operations in more than eight countries in the sub-Saharan Africa. It is now one of the largest pharmaceutical manufacturers in the region and offers a wide range of pharmaceutical products. It had less than 50 personnel in October 2004 and has steadily grown to a staff of mire than 450 employees in 2021.

The pharmaceutical division's mission is to enable universal healthcare in the markets they operate in by ensuring access to affordable, high-quality pharmaceuticals. The division focuses on providing generics in the therapeutic areas of infectious diseases, cardiology, neurology, gastroenterology, and endocrinology. The fully integrated supply chain manages the network of manufacturing and delivery geared towards offering a supply of affordable, high-quality pharmaceuticals across Africa. Each year, Dawa Life Sciences Pharmaceuticals Division provides over 100 million treatments across 25 markets on the African continent.

Animal health 
Animals continue to form an essential part of the society. Dawa Life Sciences Animal Health division concentrates on marketing products focused on livestock and companion animals. The dedicated facility can produce liquids, sachets, boluses, premixes, and external preparations for Animal Health.

Chemicals 
High yielding harvests and clean water are critical to achieving a better quality of life for all. To that end, Dawa Life Sciences Chemicals division focuses on the manufacture and distribution of various fertilizers, water purification chemicals and other industrial chemicals. At the heart of the chemical's facility is a sulphuric acid plant, surrounded by our compound fertilizer and aluminum sulphate plants. These manufacturing capabilities are integrated into a distribution network across markets in Africa to ensure the chemical's products are always available.

Operations
Dawa Life Sciences is a leading manufacturer and marketer in Kenya. It is expanding its scope of operation to become a global manufacturer while meeting various market demands. It has already an established a high-end manufacturing facility for penicillin products. It is planning to establish another new facility by investing US$290 mn to cater the need of growing business demands. It has business operations in Kenya, Uganda, Rwanda, Burundi, Zambia, Malawi, Ivory Coast, Democratic Republic of the Congo and South Sudan.

Ownership
The shares of stock of Dawa Life Sciences Pharmaceuticals, Animal Health and Chemicals Divisions are privately owned; it belongs to Dawa Life Sciences.

Dawa Life Sciences
Dawa Life Sciences is a conglomerate of four separate entities, all of which are aligned towards achieving the Group’s overall strategy. The companies and their lines of business are as below:

Dawa Limited: It is a well-known pharmaceutical manufacturer & marketer in Africa (the anchor company).

Medisel (K) Limited: It is the parent and flagship company of the Dawa Life Sciences, a leading importer and marketer of pharmaceutical (for both human & animal health) & surgical products.

Kel Chemicals Limited: It is East and Central Africa’s leading manufacturer of phosphate fertilizers and sulphuric acid-based industrial chemicals.

Forest Road Development Limited: It is a premium real estate company dedicated to the development of high-level properties in varied segments including residential and commercial.

See also
 Economy of Kenya

References

External links
Dawa Life Sciences Website

Pharmaceutical companies of Kenya
Generic drug manufacturers
Manufacturing companies based in Nairobi
Pharmaceutical companies established in 1974
Kenyan brands
Kenyan companies established in 1974